Matija Rom (born 1 November 1998) is a Slovenian footballer who plays as a right-back for Šibenik.

Club career

Domžale
In 2016, Rom was promoted to Domžale's senior team. On 10 December 2016, he made his senior team debut in the Slovenian PrvaLiga against Maribor.

References

External links
NZS profile 

1998 births
Living people
Footballers from Ljubljana
Slovenian footballers
Slovenian expatriate footballers
Association football fullbacks
NK Domžale players
NK Inter Zaprešić players
FC Kolos Kovalivka players
HNK Šibenik players
Slovenian PrvaLiga players
Croatian Football League players
Ukrainian Premier League players
Slovenia youth international footballers
Slovenia under-21 international footballers
Slovenian expatriate sportspeople in Croatia
Expatriate footballers in Croatia
Slovenian expatriate sportspeople in Ukraine
Expatriate footballers in Ukraine